Margaret Howe may refer to:

 Margaret Howe (squash player) (1897–1989), American squash player
 Margaret Howe (athlete) (born 1958), Canadian sprinter
 Margaret Howe Lovatt (born 1942), American naturalist
 Margaretta Brucker (pseudonym Margaret Howe), American fiction author
 Margaret Vale (married name Howe; 1878–?), American actress and feminist